Neklyudovo is a rural locality (a village) in Malyshevskoye Rural Settlement, Selivanovsky District, Vladimir Oblast, Russia. The population was 40 as of 2010.

Geography 
Neklyudovo is located 25 km southwest of Krasnaya Gorbatka (the district's administrative centre) by road. Malyshevo is the nearest rural locality.

References 

Rural localities in Selivanovsky District